The 2013 SAFF U-16 Championship is the second edition of the SAFF U-16 Championship hosted by Nepal from 20 to 30 July at Dasarath Stadium and army ground. Seven teams from the region are taking part, divided into two groups.

Eligible teams

 
 
 	
 		
  (Host)

Group stage
All matches will be played in Kathmandu, Nepal.
Times listed are UTC+05:45.

Group A

Group B

Knockout stage

Semi-finals

Third place

Final

Awards

References

2013 in Asian football
International association football competitions hosted by Nepal
2013
2013–14 in Nepalese football
2013 in Bangladeshi football
2013–14 in Indian football
2013 in Afghan football
2013–14 in Sri Lankan football
2013 in Bhutanese football
2013–14 in Pakistani football
2013 in youth association football